Krasny Oktyabr is a rural locality (a settlement) and the administrative center of Krasnooktyabrskoye Rural Settlement, Sredneakhtubinsky District, Volgograd Oblast, Russia. The population was 1,246 as of 2010. There are 22 streets.

Geography 
Krasny Oktyabr is located 75 km northeast of Srednyaya Akhtuba (the district's administrative centre) by road. Rassvet is the nearest rural locality.

References 

Rural localities in Sredneakhtubinsky District